The Dalling Baronetcy, of Burwood in the County of Surrey, was a title in the Baronetage of Great Britain. It was created on 11 March 1783 for the soldier and colonial administrator John Dalling. The title became extinct on the death of his only surviving son, the second Baronet, in 1864.

Dalling baronets, of Burwood (1783)
Sir John Dalling, 1st Baronet (–1798)
Sir William Windham Dalling, 2nd Baronet (1774–1864)

References

Extinct baronetcies in the Baronetage of Great Britain